Anoop Mukundan (born 11 October 1957) is a Tanzanian field hockey player. He competed in the men's tournament at the 1980 Summer Olympics.

References

External links
 

1957 births
Living people
Tanzanian male field hockey players
Olympic field hockey players of Tanzania
Field hockey players at the 1980 Summer Olympics
Place of birth missing (living people)
Tanzanian people of Indian descent